Ira Independent School District is a public school district based in the community of Ira, Texas (USA). Located in southwestern Scurry County, the district extends into a small portion of northwestern Mitchell County.

Academic achievement
In 2009, the school district was rated "academically acceptable" by the Texas Education Agency.

Schools
Ira ISD has one school Ira High School that serves students in grades kindergarten through twelve.

Special programs

Athletics
Ira High School plays six-man football.

See also

List of school districts in Texas

References

External links
Ira ISD

School districts in Scurry County, Texas
School districts in Mitchell County, Texas